Bryan–Bell Farm, also known as Oakview Plantation, is a historic plantation house and farm complex and national historic district located near Pollocksville, Jones County, North Carolina. The district encompasses 25 contributing buildings, 2 contributing sites, and 2 contributing structures spread over seven areas.  The main house was built about 1844 in the Federal style, and renovated in 1920 in the Classical Revival style.  It is a -story, five bay, frame residence with a monumental portico with Corinthian order columns.  Among the other contributing resources are the farm landscape, office (1920s), seven pack houses (1920s), equipment building (c. 1939), storage building (c. 1930), barn (c. 1840), two chicken houses (c. 1923), stable / carriage house (c. 1920), two garages (c. 1930s), equipment shed (c. 1930), metal silo (c. 1930), hay barn (c. 1932), two tobacco barns (c. 1920), I-house (c. 1880), a log barn (c. 1890), a small plank building, farm house (c. 1900), and 19th century graveyard.

It was listed on the National Register of Historic Places in 1989.

References

Plantation houses in North Carolina
Houses on the National Register of Historic Places in North Carolina
Historic districts on the National Register of Historic Places in North Carolina
Federal architecture in North Carolina
Neoclassical architecture in North Carolina
Houses completed in 1844
Houses in Jones County, North Carolina
National Register of Historic Places in Jones County, North Carolina
Farms on the National Register of Historic Places in North Carolina
1844 establishments in North Carolina